Keri is a Hebrew term which literally means "happenstance", "frivolity" or "contrariness" and has come to mean "seminal emission".

KERI is a radio station licensed to Bakersfield, California, U.S.

Keri or KERI may also refer to:

Places 
 Keri (island), an island of Estonia in the Gulf of Finland
 Keri, Järva County, a village in Koigi Parish, Järva County Estonia
 Keri, Greece, a village and a community of the island of Zakynthos
 Keri River, a river in Gujarat, India

Other uses
 Keri Lotion, a brand of moisturizing lotion by Novartis Consumer Health
 Korea Electrotechnology Research Institute, a research institute in the Republic of Korea
 Erie International Airport's ICAO code
Keri, the nom-de-guerre of Armenian fedayi commander Arshak Gavafian.

People with the surname 
 Jonah Keri (born 1974), Canadian journalist, sportswriter and editor
 Mihalj Keri (born 1951), retired Yugoslavian association football player
 Pilo Keri (born 1956), member of the Parliament of Republic of Albania

People with the given name 
 Keri Arthur, Australian novelist
 Keri Collins (born 1978), Welsh screenwriter and director
 Keri Davies, Welsh radio producer and playwright
 Keri Healey, American voice actress
 Keri Hehn (born 1981), American swimmer
 Keri Herman (born 1982), American freestyle skier
 Keri Hilson (born 1982), American singer, songwriter and actress
 Keri Hulme (born 1947), New Zealand writer
 Keri Jones (born 1969), British radio executive
 Keri Jones (rugby), (born 1945), Welsh rugby player
 Keri Kelli (born 1971), American hard rock guitarist
 Keri Noble (born 1975), American singer-songwriter
 Keri Lynn Pratt (born 1978), American actress
 Keri Russell (born 1976), American actress and dancer
 Keri Sanchez (born 1972), American former soccer defender
 Keri Smith, author, illustrator, guerrilla artist, and blogger

See also 
 Ceri (disambiguation)
 Kerry (disambiguation)